太鼓 (pronounced Taiko) is the debut album by French musician Danger. It was released in 2017.

Track listing
 1789 Records
 7:17
 11:02
 11:03
 22:41
 19:00 feat. Tasha the Amazon
 9:00
 6:42
 10:00
 0:59
 11:50 feat. Lil Brain
 21:10
 19:19
 8:10
 3:00

References

External links
 

2017 debut albums
Danger (musician) albums